The 2016 Knowsley Metropolitan Borough Council election took place on 5 May 2016 to elect members of the Knowsley Metropolitan Borough Council in England. Following a boundary review, the number of seats was reduced from 63 to 45, with all of these new seats being up for election at the same time. This was held on the same day as other local elections.

After the election, the composition of the council was:

Election Results

Overall election result

Overall result compared with 2015.

Number of seats reduced by 18.

Changes in council composition

Prior to the election the composition of the council was:

After the election, the composition of the council was:

Ward results

Cherryfield

Halewood North

Halewood South

Northwood

Page Moss

Prescot North

Prescot South

Roby

Shevington

St Gabriel's

St Michael's

Stockbridge

Swanside

Whiston and Cronton

Whitfield

Changes between 2016 and 2018

St Michael's by-election July 2017

Page Moss by-election March 2018

References

2016 English local elections
2016
2010s in Merseyside